Kreis Kempen may refer to:

Kempen (district), a district of the Prussian region of Kleve from 1816–1929
Kempen-Krefeld, a district of Rhenish Prussia and North Rhine-Westphalia from 1929–1975; see Krefeld
Kempen (Wartheland), a district of Prussian Posen from 1887–1920